Francis Macnab (born 21 June 1931) is a retired Australian Christian minister. He was the executive minister of St Michael's Uniting Church, a congregation of the Uniting Church in Australia in Collins Street, Melbourne, until December 2016. He is a fellow of the Jesus Seminar.

Early life
Macnab was born to J. D. Macnab and Mary Anne Louisa Hughes on 21 June 1931.

Personal life
Macnab married his wife, Sheila, in 1958. They have two daughters and a son.
He was made a member of the Order of Australia for his contributions to psychotherapy and religion.

Training and psychological work
Macnab holds a Doctor of Divinity degree from the University of Aberdeen. He has honorary doctorates from the University of Melbourne and RMIT University in psychology and applied science.

In 1961, Macnab opened the Cairnmillar Institute, a clinical psychological centre, the largest in Australia, which was for some time the largest training body for psychologists and counsellors in the country. He continued as its executive director until 2015.

Macnab founded and is director of the Australian Foundation for Aftermath Reactions which provides trauma treatment and training. He is a Fellow of the Australian Psychological Society.

Ministry

Following a ministry at Prahran Presbyterian Church from 1961 to 1970, Macnab became minister of the then Collins Street Congregational Church, now known as "St Michael's on Collins", in 1971. The church became a congregation of the Uniting Church in Australia at its inception in 1977. He retired on 31 December 2016

Mingary

During his ministry, Macnab has created "Mingary - the Quiet Place" a contemplative space at St Michael's open for members of the public for meditative and reflective experience. Mingary also offers low cost counselling.

Theology

"A New Faith"

In the 16 September 2008 edition of The Age, said that "The old faith is in large sections unbelievable. We want to make the new faith more believable, realistic and helpful in terms of the way people live". The new faith was launched with a $120,000 advertising campaign including posters reading, "The Ten Commandments, one of the most negative documents ever written." Macnab described Moses as a mass murderer, Abraham as concocted and Jesus as a Jewish peasant and certainly not God.

Reaction

The moderator of the synod of Victoria and Tasmania, the Revd Jason Kioa, described Macnab's comments challenging the divinity of Jesus as questioning some of the faith's most basic beliefs, turning away from 2000 years of "orthodox Christian belief". The synod of voted to request St Michael's Uniting Church to remove advertising for its new faith and apologise to Jews, Christians and Muslims for the comments it contained about the Ten Commandments. The Uniting Church did not move to discipline Macnab because no formal complaint had been received.

Scots' Church, a member church of the Presbyterian Church of Australia located across the road from St Michael's, installed a poster declaring benefits of the Ten Commandments facing towards St Michael's.

Macnab's response
In an interview with Stateline Victoria, Macnab replied to criticism saying that he was in agreement with others inside Christianity who "are asking the traditional church to re-examine and renew their basic thinking about what faith can be, because millions of people do not find the old faith meaningful to their lives." He said he "would expect that kind of reaction from people who take the scriptures far too literally."

In an address on 5 October, Macnab defended his comments, including against suggestions they were offensive to Jews, citing his study in undergraduate and postgraduate work in Hebrew language and history, including distinctions, and saying "Some of the comments have been knee-jerk reactions, uninformed and heavily overloaded with bad manners." He also stated, "While I have no intention of denigrating the Ten Commandments as a sacred symbol of the Jewish Torah and the Old Covenant, I say they are negative." He gave eight reasons why he believes the Ten Commandments to be negative and outlined his alternative 10 commandments, which he described as "positive, plausible and powerful":

In the media
In February 2010, a billboard was posted on the Monash Freeway with pictures of Florence Nightingale, Martin Luther King Jr. and MacNab. St Michael's Church's website said that while Nightingale "gave people faith in the future that kept their spirits alive" and King "started a movement that shaped attitudes of acceptance of others", Macnab "speaks to us about how a new faith can energise our bodies and spirits that is necessary to accept ourselves in a greater way, and also accept others in a spirit of generosity and open-mindedness."

The Age newspaper reported that Macnab had posted the billboard "with pictures of Florence Nightingale, Martin Luther King and himself as model leaders". It also reported accusations of self-promotion. Macnab said that the billboard was intended to give the new faith a lift for 2010 and show that individuals could make a big difference.

References

External links
St Michaels website
Cairnmillar Institute website
The Centre for Wellbeing website

Alumni of the University of Aberdeen
Macnab
RMIT University alumni
Uniting Church in Australia ministers
University of Melbourne alumni
Living people
1931 births
Members of the Order of Australia
Members of the Jesus Seminar